Irish Goodbye may refer to:

 "Irish Goodbye", a song on American musician Maria Taylor's 2007 album Lynn Teeter Flower
 Irish Goodbye, a 2011 album by American musician Mac Lethal
 Irish Goodbye, a 2013 stand-up comedy special by American comedian Morgan Murphy

See also
An Irish Goodbye, a 2022 short film
"An Irish Goodbye", an episode of animated sitcom American Dad!